Ron Crane may refer to:

 Ron Crane (engineer) (1950–2017), American electrical engineer
 Ron Crane (politician) (born 1948), American politician in Idaho